Sjoestedtius is a genus of beetles in the family Buprestidae, containing the following species:

 Sjoestedtius affinis (Obenberger, 1922)
 Sjoestedtius arrowi (Obenberger, 1922)
 Sjoestedtius buarinus (Obenberger, 1922)
 Sjoestedtius daressalamensis Obenberger, 1935
 Sjoestedtius egregius (Boheman, 1860)
 Sjoestedtius impressicollis (Kerremans, 1914)
 Sjoestedtius laticeps (Kerremans, 1914)
 Sjoestedtius madegassus Obenberger, 1939
 Sjoestedtius meinradi (Kerremans, 1907)
 Sjoestedtius monardi (Thery, 1947)
 Sjoestedtius nodiceps (Kerremans, 1900)
 Sjoestedtius nyassae Obenberger, 1935
 Sjoestedtius occisus (Kerremans, 1903)
 Sjoestedtius rhodesicus (Obenberger, 1922)
 Sjoestedtius semotus (Peringuey, 1908)
 Sjoestedtius stevensoni Obenberger, 1935
 Sjoestedtius thoracicus (Kerremans, 1903)
 Sjoestedtius tuberculifrons (Peringuey, 1908)

References

Buprestidae genera